The following is a list of players, both past and current, who appeared at least in one game for the Minnesota Twins American League franchise (1961–present), also known previously as the Washington Senators (1901–1960).

Players in bold are members of the National Baseball Hall of Fame.

Players in italics have had their numbers retired by the team.


A

Fernando Abad
Paul Abbott
Brent Abernathy
Ted Abernathy
A. J. Achter
José Acosta
Merito Acosta
Austin Adams
Glenn Adams
Mike Adams
Rick Adams
Spencer Adams
Morrie Aderholt
Dewey Adkins
Ehire Adrianza
Joe Agler
Sam Agnew
Juan Agosto
Rick Aguilera
Eddie Ainsmith
Jerry Akers
Joe Albanese
Andrew Albers
Vic Albury
Jorge Alcala
Scott Aldred
Bernie Allen
Chad Allen
Bob Allison
Mel Almada
Dave Altizer
Joe Altobelli
Nick Altrock
Ossie Álvarez
Brant Alyea
Allan Anderson
John Anderson
Red Anderson
Shaun Anderson
Bill Andrus
Pete Appleton
Chris Archer
George Archie
Oswaldo Arcia
Danny Ardoin
Orville Armbrust
Luis Arráez
Gerry Arrigo
Fernando Arroyo
Ken Aspromonte
Willians Astudillo
Keith Atherton
Lefty Atkinson
Jake Atz
Tyler Austin
Alex Avila
Luis Ayala
Doc Ayers

B

Wally Backman
Mike Bacsik
Homer Bailey
Chuck Baker
Doug Baker
Floyd Baker
Jesse Baker
Scott Baker
James Baldwin
Grant Balfour
Pelham Ballenger
Win Ballou
Eddie Bane
George Banks
Willie Banks
Travis Baptist
Red Barbary
Steve Barber
Turner Barber
Bruce Barmes
Charlie Barnes
John Barnes
Red Barnes
Kyle Barraclough
Bill Barrett
Frank Barron
Jason Bartlett
Brian Bass
Dick Bass
Randy Bass
Tony Batista
Earl Battey
Don Baylor
Walter Beall
Belve Bean
Billy Beane
Gene Bearden
Heinie Beckendorf
Charlie Becker
Rich Becker
Julio Bécquer
Steve Bedrosian
Joe Beimel
Matt Belisle
Erik Bennett
Allen Benson
Joe Benson
Jack Bentley
Lou Berberet
Juan Berenguer
James Beresford
Moe Berg
Johnny Berger
Sean Bergman
Bob Berman
Doug Bernier
José Berríos
Reno Bertoia
Karl Best
Bill Bethea
Lou Bevil
Harry Biemiller
George Binks
Red Bird
Jeff Bittiger
Joe Black
Nick Blackburn
Casey Blake
Henry Blanco
Travis Blankenhorn
Cliff Blankenship
Bruno Block
Jimmy Bloodworth
Bud Bloomfield
Ossie Bluege
Bert Blyleven
Joe Boehling
Bob Boken
Joe Bokina
Ed Boland
Milt Bolling
Cliff Bolton
Walt Bond
Joe Bonikowski
Gus Bono
Boof Bonser
Zeke Bonura
Greg Booker
Al Bool
Bret Boone
Pat Borders
Glenn Borgmann
Paul Boris
Buddy Boshers
Harley Boss
Lyman Bostock
Dave Boswell
Pat Bourque
Rob Bowen
Shane Bowers
Elmer Bowman
Travis Bowyer
Blaine Boyer
George Bradshaw
Bucky Brandon
Steve Braun
Garland Braxton
Brent Brede
Ad Brennan
Craig Breslow
Ken Brett
Rocky Bridges
Johnny Briggs
Jim Brillheart
Bernardo Brito
Dick Brodowski
Tony Brottem
Frank Brower
Alton Brown
Darrell Brown
Jarvis Brown
Lloyd Brown
Mark Brown
George Browne
Fred Bruckbauer
J. T. Bruett
Greg Brummett
Tom Brunansky
Steve Brye
Brian Buchanan
Garland Buckeye
Bud Bulling
Eric Bullock
Dylan Bundy
Tom Burgmeier
Bobby Burke
Alex Burnett
Bill Burns
Sean Burroughs
Beau Burrows
Jared Burton
Dennis Burtt
Jim Busby
Brian Buscher
Alan Busenitz
Donie Bush
Joe Bush
Randy Bush
John Butcher
Drew Butera
Sal Butera
Ed Butka
Bill Butler
Byron Buxton
Bud Byerly
Tommy Byrne

C

Orlando Cabrera
Carmen Cali
Paul Calvert
Jack Calvo
Archie Campbell
Bill Campbell
Bruce Campbell
John Campbell
Kevin Campbell
Sal Campisi
Frank Campos
John Candelaria
Milo Candini
Jay Canizaro
Yennier Canó
Matt Capps
Leo Cárdenas
Rod Carew
Scoops Carey
Leon Carlson
Steve Carlton
Roy Carlyle
Lew Carpenter
Héctor Carrasco
Alex Carrasquel
Bill Carrick
Don Carrithers
Jamey Carroll
Matt Carson
Scott Cary
Joe Cascarella
George Case
Joe Casey
Carl Cashion
Larry Casian
Alexi Casilla
Harry Cassady
Joe Cassidy
Bobby Castillo
Carmen Castillo
Luis Castillo
John Castino
Jason Castro
Juan Castro
Eli Cates
Hardin Cathey
Jake Cave
Gilberto Celestino
Juan Centeno
Bob Chakales
Dean Chance
Ben Chapman
Ed Chapman
J. T. Chargois
Mike Chartak
Ken Chase
Harry Child
Rich Chiles
Walt Chipple
Neil Chrisley
John Christensen
Mark Christman
Al Cicotte
Pete Cimino
Jeff Cirillo
Howie Clark
Jerald Clark
Jim Clark
Ron Clark
Boileryard Clarke
Webbo Clarke
Ellis Clary
Joe Cleary
Tex Clevenger
Harlond Clift
Billy Clingman
Tyler Clippard
Otis Clymer
Gil Coan
Dick Coffman
Syd Cohen
Chris Colabello
Greg Colbrunn
Alex Cole
Edwar Colina
Orth Collins
Jackie Collum
Alex Colomé
Bartolo Colón
Merl Combs
Keith Comstock
Tom Connolly
Bill Conroy
Wid Conroy
Billy Consolo
Jim Constable
Sandy Consuegra
Mark Contreras
Charlie Conway
Jerry Conway
Mike Cook
Ron Coomer
Cal Cooper
Don Cooper
Henry Coppola
Doug Corbett
Ray Corbin
Tim Corcoran
Marty Cordova
Carlos Correa
Kevin Correia
Jharel Cotton
Neal Cotts
Bill Coughlin
Danny Coulombe
Clint Courtney
Harry Courtney
Stan Coveleski
Molly Craft
Jesse Crain
Doc Cramer
Sam Crane
Gavvy Cravath
Joe Crede
Jack Cressend
Jerry Crider
Herb Crompton
C. J. Cron
Joe Cronin
Tom Crooke
Lave Cross
Frank Croucher
Alvin Crowder
Ed Crowley
Nelson Cruz
Mike Cubbage
Michael Cuddyer
Bert Cueto
Leon Culberson
Roy Cullenbine
Nick Cullop
Midre Cummings
Bill Cunningham
Bill Currie
Vern Curtis
John Curtiss

D

Bill Dailey
Logan Darnell
Bobby Darwin
Yo-Yo Davalillo
Andre David
Claude Davidson
Cleatus Davidson
Mark Davidson
Chili Davis
Ike Davis
Ron Davis
Chase De Jong
Harry Dean
Pat Dean
Buddy Dear
Joe Decker
Samuel Deduno
Ed Delahanty
Jim Delahanty
Rob Delaney
Juan Delis
Gene DeMontreville
Rick Dempsey
Sam Dente
Julio DePaula
Jim Deshaies
Jimmie DeShong
Cole De Vries
Scott Diamond
R. A. Dickey
Bill Dietrich
Roy Dietzel
Jay Difani
Reese Diggs
Brian Dinkelman
Sonny Dixon
Dan Dobbek
Randy Dobnak
Jiggs Donahue
Tim Donahue
Josh Donaldson
Jim Donohue
Patsy Donovan
Gary Dotter
Ryan Doumit
Jack Doyle
Brian Dozier
Buzz Dozier
Larry Drake
Oliver Drake
Lew Drill
Tom Drohan
Tim Drummond
Brian Duensing
Pat Duff
Tyler Duffey
Gus Dugas
Zach Duke
Phil Dumatrait
George Dumont
Sam Dungan
Davey Dunkle
Steve Dunn
Jhoan Durán
Mike Durant
J. D. Durbin
Bull Durham
Mike Duvall
Jim Dwyer
Mike Dyer
Sam Dyson

E

Ryan Eades
Jake Early
Carl East
Ed Edelen
Tom Edens
Bob Edmundson
Sam Edmonston
Bruce Edwards
Dave Edwards
Jim Eisenreich
Kid Elberfeld
Frank Ellerbe
Bones Ely
Joe Engel
Dave Engle
Russ Ennis
Dietrich Enns
Eric Erickson
Roger Erickson
Scott Erickson
Cal Ermer
Eduardo Escobar
Álvaro Espinoza
Bobby Estalella
Frank Eufemia
Al Evans
Joe Evans
Adam Everett
Bill Everitt
Willie Eyre

F

Lenny Faedo
Cy Falkenberg
Luke Farrell
John Farrell
Terry Felton
Alex Ferguson
Rick Ferrell
Wes Ferrell
Sergio Ferrer
Tom Ferrick
Mike Fetters
Johnny Field
Casey Fien
Danny Fife
Mark Filley
Pete Filson
Tony Fiore
Bill Fischer
Carl Fischer
Clarence Fisher
Showboat Fisher
Ed Fitz Gerald
Ira Flagstead
Ángel Fleitas
Randy Flores
Pedro Florimón
John Flynn
Ray Fontenot
Dan Ford
Lew Ford
Bill Forman
Mike Fornieles
Logan Forsythe
Jerry Fosnow
George Foss
Eddie Foster
Pop Foster
Matt Fox
Ray Francis
George Frazier
Kevin Frederick
Jerry Freeman
Skipper Friday
Bob Friedrichs
Eric Fryer
Brian Fuentes
Sam Fuld
Aaron Fultz
Mark Funderburk

G

Armando Gabino
Gary Gaetti
Greg Gagne
Chick Gagnon
Nemo Gaines
Stan Galle
Bert Gallia
Chick Gandil
Bob Ganley
John Gant
Babe Ganzel
Keith Garagozzo
Rich Garcés
Édgar García
Jaime Garcia
Ramón García
Billy Gardner
Kyle Garlick
Mitch Garver
Matt Garza
Ralph Garza
Dave Gassner
Milt Gaston
Brent Gates
Dale Gear
Cory Gearrin
Bob Gebhard
Elmer Gedeon
Joe Gedeon
Dillon Gee
Henry Gehring
Charlie Gelbert
George Genovese
Doc Gessler
Al Gettel
Patsy Gharrity
Ian Gibaut
Kyle Gibson
Paul Giel
Ed Gill
Johnny Gill
Carden Gillenwater
Grant Gillis
Chris Gimenez
Tony Giuliani
Dan Gladden
Joe Gleason
José Godoy
Ed Goebel
Dave Goltz
Carlos Gómez
Chile Gómez
Chris Gomez
Lefty Gomez
Luis Gómez
Preston Gómez
Rubén Gómez
Stephen Gonsalves
Vince Gonzales
Chi Chi González
Germán González
Julio González
Marwin González
Charlie Gooch
Clyde Goodwin
Danny Goodwin
Marv Goodwin
Ray Goolsby
Nick Gordon
Bob Gorinski
Johnny Goryl
Goose Goslin
Mauro Gozzo
Joe Grace
Mike Grady
Dan Graham
J. R. Graham
Oscar Graham
Wayne Granger
Zack Granite
Mudcat Grant
Mickey Grasso
Brusdar Graterol
Dolly Gray
Jeff Gray
Milt Gray
Sonny Gray
Lenny Green
Vean Gregg
Seth Greisinger
Bert Griffith
Clark Griffith
Hal Griggs
Connie Grob
Bob Groom
Harley Grossman
Robbie Grossman
Johnny Groth
Roy Grover
Joe Grzenda
Eddie Guardado
Mike Guerra
Matt Guerrier
Randy Gumpert
Bucky Guth
Mark Guthrie
Cristian Guzmán

H

Eric Hacker
Bump Hadley
Mickey Haefner
Dick Hahn
Chip Hale
David Hale
Justin Haley
Jimmie Hall
Tom Hall
Ian Hamilton
Pete Hamm
Bill Hands
Greg Hansell
Roy Hansen
J. A. Happ
Carroll Hardy
Harry Hardy
J. J. Hardy
Jack Hardy
Pinky Hargrave
Brian Harper
Harry Harper
Ryne Harper
Brendan Harris
Bucky Harris
Dave Harris
Greg Harris
Joe Harris
Lum Harris
Mickey Harris
Spencer Harris
Harrison
Roric Harrison
Earl Harrist
Mike Hart
Mike Hartley
Paul Hartzell
Mickey Hatcher
Brad Havens
Roy Hawes
LaTroy Hawkins
Hal Haydel
Jackie Hayes
Jim Hayes
Joe Haynes
Jeff Heath
Neal Heaton
Harry Hedgpeth
Chris Heintz
Jim Heise
Frank Hemphill
Jack Hendricks
Liam Hendriks
Sean Henn
John Henry
Ron Henry
Phil Hensiek
Evelio Hernández
Jackie Hernández
Liván Hernández
Pedro Hernández
Rudy Hernández
Tom Herr
Walt Herrell
Herb Herring
Lefty Herring
Chris Herrmann
Whitey Herzog
Chris Heston
Mike Heydon
Charlie Hickman
Aaron Hicks
Trevor Hildenberger
Donnie Hill
Herman Hill
Hunter Hill
Jesse Hill
Rich Hill
Dutch Hinrichs
Larry Hisle
Billy Hitchcock
Lloyd Hittle
John Hobbs
Denny Hocking
Mel Hoderlein
Ed Hodge
Jim Hoey
Izzy Hoffman
Ray Hoffman
Shanty Hogan
Elon Hogsett
Wally Holborow
Sammy Holbrook
Bill Hollahan
Bill Holland
Al Hollingsworth
Bonnie Hollingsworth
Dave Hollins
Jeff Holly
Steve Holm
Ducky Holmes
Jim Holt
Paul Hopkins
Bill Hopper
Vince Horsman
Ed Hovlik
Joe Hovlik
Dave Howard
Steve Howe
Kent Hrbek
Justin Huber
Willis Hudlin
Orlando Hudson
Sid Hudson
Frank Huelsman
Dusty Hughes
Jim Hughes
Luke Hughes
Phil Hughes
Tom Hughes
Philip Humber
Randy Hundley
Torii Hunter
Butch Huskey
Dick Hyde

I

Riccardo Ingram
Hank Izquierdo

J

Darrell Jackson
Darrin Jackson
Mike Jackson
Ron Jackson
Roy Lee Jackson
Bucky Jacobs
Jake Jacobs
Beany Jacobson
Chuck James
Charlie Jamieson
Hal Janvrin
Kevin Jarvis
Griffin Jax
Tex Jeanes
Ryan Jeffers
Jackie Jensen
Marcus Jensen
Kevin Jepsen
Houston Jiménez
Adam Johnson
Bob Johnson
Dave Johnson
Don Johnson
Ed Johnson
Kris Johnson
Randy Johnson
Tom Johnson
Walter Johnson
Greg Johnston
Charlie Jones
Dick Jones
Garrett Jones
Jacque Jones
Sam Jones
Todd Jones
Buck Jordan
Rip Jordan
Tim Jordan
Felix Jorge
Ryan Jorgensen
Terry Jorgensen
Ralph Judd
Joe Judge

K

Jim Kaat
Mike Kahoe
Alex Kampouris
Bill Kay
Burt Keeley
Bill Keister
Hal Keller
Ron Keller
Harry Kelley
Frank Kelliher
Pat Kelly
Roberto Kelly
Speed Kelly
Tom Kelly
Russ Kemmerer
Eddie Kenna
Bill Kennedy
Vern Kennedy
Bill Kenworthy
Max Kepler
Bobby Keppel
Gus Keriazakos
John Kerr
Bobby Kielty
Harmon Killebrew
Red Killefer
Dick Kimble
Jerry Kindall
Wes Kingdon
Tyler Kinley
Matt Kinney
Mike Kinnunen
Brandon Kintzler
Bob Kipper
Alex Kirilloff
Frank Kitson
Malachi Kittridge
Tom Klawitter
Ed Klieman
Bob Kline
Bobby Kline
Ron Kline
Scott Klingenbeck
Joe Klink
Johnny Klippstein
Elmer Klumpp
Clyde Kluttz
Lou Knerr
John Knight
Chuck Knoblauch
Punch Knoll
Joe Kohlman
Erik Komatsu
Jerry Koosman
Merlin Kopp
Steve Korcheck
Bobby Korecky
Andy Kosco
Corey Koskie
Frank Kostro
Al Kozar
Joe Krakauskas
Jack Kralick
Mike Kreevich
Red Kress
Bill Krueger
Jason Kubel
Joe Kuhel
Rusty Kuntz
Craig Kusick
Bob Kuzava
Al Kvasnak

L

Al LaMacchia
Ryan LaMarre
David Lamb
Mike Lamb
Bobby LaMotte
Dick Lanahan
Doc Land
Ken Landreaux
Jerry Lane
Sam Lanford
Pete Lapan
Frank LaPorte
Gene Larkin
Trevor Larnach
Dave LaRoche
Lyn Lary
Fred Lasher
Bill Latham
Chris Latham
Tim Laudner
Doc Lavan
Derek Law
Matt Lawton
Hillis Layne
Charlie Lea
Terry Leach
Matthew LeCroy
Derek Lee
Don Lee
Watty Lee
Bill Lefebvre
Wade Lefler
Nemo Leibold
Ed Leip
Scott Leius
Jack Lelivelt
Jim Lemon
Dutch Leonard
Joe Leonard
Ted Lepcio
Charlie Letchas
Jesse Levan
Buddy Lewis
Duffy Lewis
Jim Lewis
Royce Lewis
Pat Light
Tzu-Wei Lin
Mike Lincoln
Ed Linke
Francisco Liriano
Nelson Liriano
Joe Lis
Hod Lisenbee
Ad Liska
Zack Littell
Jeff Little
Mickey Livingston
Bob Loane
George Loepp
Frank Loftus
Kyle Lohse
Steve Lombardozzi
Tom Long
Bruce Look
Slim Love
Dwight Lowry
Steve Luebber
Ralph Lumenti
Tom Lundstedt
Charlie Luskey
Lyle Luttrell
Jim Lyle
Jerry Lynn
Lance Lynn
Ed Lyons
Rick Lysander

M

Kevin Maas
Danny MacFayden
Shane Mack
Pete Mackanin
Felix Mackiewicz
Matt Macri
Kenta Maeda
Héctor Maestri
Matt Magill
Ron Mahay
Pat Mahomes
Mike Maksudian
Bobby Malkmus
Jim Mallory
Matt Maloney
Frank Mancuso
Jim Manning
Fred Manrique
Jeff Manship
Charlie Manuel
Moxie Manuel
Heinie Manush
Howard Maple
Georges Maranda
Firpo Marberry
Red Marion
Jason Marquis
Connie Marrero
Fred Marsh
Mike Marshall
Billy Martin
Joe Martin
Joe Martina
Marty Martínez
Rogelio Martínez
Tippy Martinez
Del Mason
Mike Mason
Dan Masteller
Walt Masters
Walt Masterson
Darin Mastroianni
Eddie Matteson
Wid Matthews
Joe Mauer
Carmen Mauro
Jason Maxwell
Trevor May
Sam Mayer
Joe Mays
Bill McAfee
Tom McAvoy
George McBride
Tom McBride
Joe McCabe
David McCarty
Alex McColl
Barry McCormick
Mike McCormick
Quinton McCracken
Paul McCullough
Phil McCullough
Mickey McDermott
Danny McDevitt
Darnell McDonald
John McDonald
Howie McFarland
Frank McGee
Slim McGrew
Vance McIlree
Dave McKay
Al McLean
Jim McLeod
Hugh McMullen
Mike McNally
George McNamara
Earl McNeely
Pat Meares
Sammy Meeks
Trevor Megill
Dave Meier
Adalberto Mejia
Sam Mele
Minnie Mendoza
Mike Menosky
Orlando Mercado
Win Mercer
Orlando Merced
Brett Merriman
Jim Merritt
Jim Mertz
Matt Merullo
Irish Meusel
Alex Meyer
Cass Michaels
Doug Mientkiewicz
John Mihalic
José Mijares
Clyde Milan
Horace Milan
Larry Milbourne
Mike Milchin
Dee Miles
Bing Miller
Bob Miller
Corky Miller
Damian Miller
Ian Miller
Jason Miller
Ox Miller
Ralph Miller (3B)
Ralph Miller (LHP)
Ronny Miller
Travis Miller
Warren Miller
Wally Millies
John Milligan
Tommy Milone
Eric Milton
Juan Minaya
Don Mincher
Don Minnick
José Miranda
Willy Miranda
Bobby Mitchell
Mike Mitchell
Monroe Mitchell
George Mitterwald
Chad Moeller
Danny Moeller
George Mogridge
Dustan Mohr
Paul Molitor
Craig Monroe
René Monteagudo
Dan Monzon
Carlos Moore
Gene Moore
Ray Moore
José Morales (DH/1B)
José Morales (C)
Kendrys Morales
Charles Moran
Jovani Morán
Roy Moran
Julio Moreno
Mike Morgan
Ray Morgan
Tom Morgan
Juan Morillo
Mike Morin
Bill Morley
Justin Morneau
Bill Morrell
Danny Morris
Jack Morris
Warren Morris
Logan Morrison
John Moses
Danny Mota
Taylor Motter
Gabriel Moya
Ed Moyer
Terry Mulholland
Jim Mullen
Dick Mulligan
George Mullin
Kevin Mulvey
Oscar Múñoz
Pedro Muñoz
Buzz Murphy
John Ryan Murphy
Bill Murray
Bobby Murray
George Murray
Danny Musser
Paul Musser
George Myatt
Buddy Myer
Greg Myers

N

Steve Nagy
Mike Nakamura
Hal Naragon
Cotton Nash
Joe Nathan
Dan Naulty
Denny Neagle
Doug Neff
Mel Nelson
Pat Neshek
Graig Nettles
Jim Nettles
Phil Nevin
Al Newman
Bobo Newsom
Joe Niekro
Randy Niemann
Chuck Nieson
Tom Nieto
Johnny Niggeling
Rabbit Nill
Tsuyoshi Nishioka
Otis Nixon
Russ Nixon
Ricky Nolasco
Irv Noren
Tom Norton
Willie Norwood
Joe Nossek
Eduardo Núñez

O

Bailey Ober
Frank Oberlin
Jack O'Brien
Pete O'Brien
Tommy O'Brien
Alex Ochoa
Jack O'Connor
Jake Odorizzi
Bryan Oelkers
José Offerman
Curly Ogden
Joe Ohl
Augie Ojeda
Len Okrie
Bob Oldis
Tony Oliva
Francisco Oliveras
Lester Oliveros
Jim Ollom
Greg Olson
Gregg Olson
Karl Olson
Mickey O'Neil
Bill O'Neill
Jim O'Neill
Eddie Onslow
Ernie Oravetz
Jesse Orosco
Frank O'Rourke
Ryan O'Rourke
Al Orth
Baby Ortiz
David Ortiz
Junior Ortiz
Ramón Ortiz
Roberto Ortiz
Champ Osteen
Johnny Ostrowski
Bill Otey

P

John Pacella
Chris Paddack
Tom Padden
Emilio Pagán
Mike Pagliarulo
Jermaine Palacios
Mike Palagyi
Emilio Palmero
Ed Palmquist
Byung-ho Park
Blake Parker
Derek Parks
Chris Parmelee
José Parra
Camilo Pascual
Carlos Pascual
Larry Pashnick
Frank Pastore
Case Patten
Carlos Paula
Carl Pavano
Mike Pazik
Jim Pearce
Albie Pearson
Roger Peckinpaugh
Les Peden
Mike Pelfrey
Barney Pelty
Luis Perdomo
Martín Pérez
Dan Perkins
Glen Perkins
Sam Perlozzo
Ron Perranoski
Nig Perrine
Jim Perry
Stan Perzanowski
Johnny Pesky
Gregorio Petit
Jay Pettibone
Leon Pettit
Bill Phebus
Babe Phelps
Eddie Phillips
Tom Phillips
Val Picinich
Charlie Pick
Ollie Pickering
Marino Pieretti
A. J. Pierzynski
Michael Pineda
Yohan Pino
Josmil Pinto
Alex Pitko
Chris Pittaro
Bill Pleis
Herb Plews
Trevor Plouffe
Mike Poepping
Jimmy Pofahl
Jorge Polanco
Sidney Ponson
Sean Poppen
Dan Porter
Jay Porter
Bob Porterfield
Mark Portugal
Wally Post
Squire Potter
Hosken Powell
Jake Powell
Paul Powell
Vic Power
Ryan Pressly
Bob Prichard
Jerry Priddy
Jason Pridie
Alex Prieto
Ray Prim
Tom Prince
Jake Propst
Doc Prothro
Kirby Puckett
Carlos Pulido
Spencer Pumpelly
Nick Punto
Pat Putnam
Ewald Pyle

Q

Hal Quick
Frank Quilici
Tom Quinlan
Joe Quinn
Luis Quiñones

R

Brian Raabe
Josh Rabe
Brad Radke
Rob Radlosky
Frank Ragland
Doc Ralston
Neil Ramirez
Wilkin Ramírez
Pedro Ramos
Wilson Ramos
Bob Randall
Earl Rapp
Gary Rath
Paul Ratliff
Jon Rauch
Shane Rawley
Jeff Reardon
Jeff Reboulet
Pete Redfern
Mark Redman
Jack Redmond
Mike Redmond
Addison Reed
Darren Reed
Jeff Reed
Rick Reed
Stan Rees
Rich Reese
Bobby Reeves
Rob Refsnyder
Herman Reich
Doc Reisling
Rick Renick
Bob Repass
Jason Repko
Michael Restovich
Ben Revere
Dennys Reyes
Carl Reynolds
Harry Rice
Sam Rice
Lance Richbourg
J. T. Riddle
Johnny Riddle
Topper Rigney
Jim Riley
Juan Rincón
Todd Ritchie
Luis Rivas
Bombo Rivera
René Rivera
Joe Roa
Roxie Roach
Red Roberts
Dick Robertson
Rich Robertson
Sherry Robertson
Tyler Robertson
Eddie Robinson
Rabbit Robinson
Shane Robinson
Hansel Robles
Armando Roche
Fernando Rodney
Dereck Rodríguez
Frank Rodriguez
José Rodríguez
Luis Rodríguez
Vic Rodriguez
Clay Roe
Josh Roenicke
Buck Rogers
Kenny Rogers
Taylor Rogers
Garry Roggenburk
Tony Roig
Jim Roland
Rich Rollins
Fernando Romero
J. C. Romero
Jhon Romero
Sergio Romo
John Romonosky
Henri Rondeau
Phil Roof
Brent Rooker
Ben Rortvedt
Eddie Rosario
Randy Rosario
Johnny Roseboro
Bob Ross
Braggo Roth
Claude Rothgeb
Drew Rucinski
Muddy Ruel
Dutch Ruether
Randy Ruiz
Pete Runnels
Allen Russell
Jack Russell
Jack Ryan
Jason Ryan
Jimmy Ryan
Joe Ryan
Michael Ryan

S

Alex Sabo
Frank Sacka
Ted Sadowski
Mark Salas
Ron Samford
Benj Sampson
Alejandro Sánchez
Gary Sánchez
Raúl Sánchez
Ken Sanders
Cole Sands
Fred Sanford
Jack Sanford
Mo Sanford
Miguel Sano
Danny Santana
Ervin Santana
Johan Santana
Hector Santiago
Jack Savage
Don Savidge
Carl Sawyer
Ray Scarborough
Mac Scarce
Al Schacht
Germany Schaefer
Jordan Schafer
Logan Schafer
Johnny Schaive
Dan Schatzeder
Owen Scheetz
Lefty Schegg
Fred Schemanske
Larry Schlafly
Johnny Schmitz
Jerry Schoonmaker
Jonathan Schoop
Al Schroll
Ken Schrom
Ron Schueler
Erik Schullstrom
Art Schult
Frank Schulte
Fred Schulte
Everett Scott
Todd Sears
Jimmy Sebring
Duke Sedgwick
Kip Selbach
Dan Serafini
Gary Serum
John Sevcik
Hank Severeid
Luke Sewell
Warren Shanabrook
Howie Shanks
Owen Shannon
Red Shannon
Shag Shaughnessy
Jon Shave
Jim Shaw
Spec Shea
Jim Shellenback
Bert Shepard
Fred Sherry
Steve Shields
Garland Shifflett
Bill Shipke
Art Shires
Duke Shirey
Mule Shirley
Matt Shoemaker
Burt Shotton
Dwight Siebler
Rubén Sierra
Roy Sievers
Carlos Silva
Danny Silva
Al Sima
Al Simmons
Andrelton Simmons
John Simmons
Bill Singer
Elmer Singleton
Fred Sington
George Sisler
Anthony Slama
Jack Slattery
Lou Sleater
Aaron Slegers
Kevin Slowey
Roy Smalley
Devin Smeltzer
John Smiley
Bull Smith
Carr Smith
Charlie Smith
Earl Smith
Elmer Smith
Joe Smith
Mike Smith
Ray Smith
Roy Smith
Tony Smith
Wally Smith
Mike Smithson
Bill Snyder
Jerry Snyder
Jim Snyder
Eric Soderholm
Rick Sofield
Jock Somerlott
Paul Sorrento
Dick Spalding
Denard Span
Tris Speaker
By Speece
Chris Speier
Stan Spence
Ben Spencer
Roy Spencer
Jack Spring
Randy St. Claire
Jake Stahl
Scott Stahoviak
Kevin Stanfield
Lee Stange
Joe Stanley
Con Starkel
Bill Starr
Dick Starr
Cody Stashak
Tim Stauffer
Terry Steinbach
Mike Stenhouse
Buzz Stephen
Dave Stevens
Jim Stevens
Bud Stewart
Bunky Stewart
Kohl Stewart
Lefty Stewart
Shannon Stewart
Stuffy Stewart
Dick Stigman
Chuck Stobbs
Dean Stone
Dick Stone
John Stone
Les Straker
Alan Strange
Gabby Street
Jim Strickland
Luis Suárez
Willie Sudhoff
Denny Sullivan
Frank Sullivan
John Sullivan
Steve Sundra
Pete Susko
Dizzy Sutherland
John Sutton
Kurt Suzuki
Anthony Swarzak
Greg Swindell

T

Jesse Tannehill
Kevin Tapani
Bennie Tate
Hughie Tate
Walt Tauscher
Danny Taylor
Fred Taylor
Tommy Taylor
Nick Tepesch
Jerry Terrell
Wayne Terwilliger
Dick Tettelbach
Tim Teufel
Bob Tewksbury
Greg Thayer
Jug Thesenga
Caleb Thielbar
Brad Thomas
Bud Thomas
Claude Thomas
Clete Thomas
Fred Thomas
George Thomas
Kite Thomas
Lefty Thomas
Myles Thomas
Tommy Thomas
Jim Thome
Aaron Thompson
Danny Thompson
Forrest Thompson
Harry Thompson
Jack Thoney
Paul Thormodsgard
Tyler Thornburg
Lewis Thorpe
Faye Throneberry
Lou Thuman
Sloppy Thurston
Luis Tiant
Terry Tiffee
Joe Tipton
Tom Tischinski
Jack Tobin
Hal Toenes
Matt Tolbert
Freddie Toliver
Doc Tonkin
Michael Tonkin
Gil Torres
Ricardo Torres
Ronald Torreyes
Kelvin Torve
Rene Tosoni
César Tovar
Happy Townsend
Cecil Travis
Ray Treadaway
Frank Trechock
Mike Trombley
Bill Trotter
George Tsamis
Ollie Tucker
Lee Tunnell
Lucas Turk
Nik Turley
Bill Tuttle
George Twombly
Jason Tyner

U

Jimmy Uchrinscko
Ted Uhlaender
Scott Ullger
Sandy Ullrich
Tom Umphlett
Bob Unglaub
Tom Upton
Gio Urshela
Bob Usher

V

Roy Valdés
Sandy Valdespino
José Valdivielso
Danny Valencia
Javier Valentín
Vito Valentinetti
Elmer Valo
Clay Van Alstyne
Ildemaro Vargas
Kennys Vargas
Buck Varner
Andrew Vasquez
Esmerling Vásquez
Fred Vaughn
Hippo Vaughn
Bobby Veach
Jesús Vega
Vince Ventura
Gene Verble
John Verhoeven
Mickey Vernon
Zoilo Versalles
Bob Veselic
Nick Vincent
Frank Viola
Clyde Vollmer
Cy Vorhees
Joe Vosmik

W

Brandon Waddell
Jake Wade
LaMonte Wade Jr.
Rip Wade
Howard Wakefield
Matt Walbeck
Doc Waldbauer
Irv Waldron
Kyle Waldrop
Dixie Walker (P)
Gee Walker
Tilly Walker
Todd Walker
Murray Wall
Charley Walters
Mike Walters
P. J. Walters
Danny Walton
Gary Ward
Jay Ward
Curt Wardle
Cy Warmoth
John Warner
Jimmy Wasdell
Ron Washington
Scott Watkins
Tommy Watkins
Allie Watt
Gary Wayne
Jim Weaver
Monte Weaver
Lenny Webster
Ralph Weigel
Dick Weik
Johnny Welaj
Bob Wells
Greg Wells
Dick Welteroth
Vic Wertz
David West
Sam West
Jason Wheeler
Pete Whisenant
Bill Whitby
Rondell White
Steve White
Aaron Whitefield
Earl Whitehill
Charlie Whitehouse
Len Whitehouse
Bob Wiesler
Mark Wiley
Rob Wilfong
Adam Wilk
Albert Williams
Don Williams
Glenn Williams
Mutt Williams
Otto Williams
Rip Williams
Stan Williams
Josh Willingham
Carl Willis
Archie Wilson
Bobby Wilson
Highball Wilson
Jack Wilson
John Wilson
Max Wilson
Tack Wilson
Tom Wilson
Willy Wilson
Alex Wimmers
Josh Winder
Ed Wineapple
Dave Winfield
Ted Wingfield
Jim Winn
Matt Wisler
Roy Witherup
Barney Wolfe
Larry Wolfe
Roger Wolff
Harry Wolverton
Ken Wood
Hal Woodeshick
Alvis Woods
Dick Woodson
Frank Woodward
Junior Wooten
Vance Worley
Al Worthington
Taffy Wright
Tom Wright
Butch Wynegar
Early Wynn
Hank Wyse

Y

Rich Yett
Earl Yingling
Bill Yohe
Eddie Yost
Delmon Young
Chief Youngblood

Z

Tom Zachary
Geoff Zahn
Paul Zahniser
José Zardón
Norm Zauchin
Bill Zepp
Jerry Zimmerman
Bill Zinser
Bill Zuber

See also
:Category:Minnesota Twins players
:Category:Washington Senators (1901–1960) players

External links
Minnesota Twins Player Career Batting Register

Major League Baseball all-time rosters
Roster